Henryk Tomanek (born 23 January 1955) is a Polish wrestler. He competed in the men's Greco-Roman +100 kg at the 1976 Summer Olympics.

References

1955 births
Living people
Polish male sport wrestlers
Olympic wrestlers of Poland
Wrestlers at the 1976 Summer Olympics
People from Siemianowice Śląskie
Sportspeople from Silesian Voivodeship